Gorwel Owen is a Welsh producer and musician. He has worked with Datblygu, Gorky's Zygotic Mynci, Super Furry Animals, Hwyl Nofio, Ffa Coffi Pawb, Gwenno, Steve Eaves, Melys, Bob Delyn a'r Ebillion, Llio Rhydderch and many others. He also co-writes, records and performs with his wife, the poet Fiona Owen; their third album Releasing Birds was released in 2015  via their label Yamoosh!. He is also involved in other music and sound-making activities such as free improvisation, composition and sound installation.

Discography
 Super Furry Animals - Fuzzy Logic, 1996 - co-producer
 Gorky's Zygotic Mynci - Barafundle, 1997 - co-producer
 Super Furry Animals - Radiator,1997 - co-producer
 Gorky's Zygotic Mynci - Gorky 5, 1998 - co-producer
 Gorky's Zygotic Mynci - The Blue Trees, 1997 - co-producer
 Gorky's Zygotic Mynci - Spanish Dance Troupe, 1999 - co-producer
 Super Furry Animals - Mwng, 2000 - co-producer
 Gorky's Zygotic Mynci - How I Long to Feel That Summer in My Heart, 2001 - co-producer
 Pondman - In Between, 2002 - co-writer and performer
 Euros Childs - Chops, 2006 - co-producer
 Hwyl Nofio - Hounded by Fury, 2006 - performer
 Fiona & Gorwel Owen - Spring Always Comes, 2008 - co-writer and performer
 Gruff Rhys - Hotel Shampoo, 2010 - co-producer

References

External links
 

Welsh record producers
Living people
Year of birth missing (living people)